Clinton Bernard Sampson (January 4, 1961 – December 25, 2005) was an American football wide receiver in the National Football League (NFL). He was drafted by the Denver Broncos in the third round of the 1983 NFL Draft. He played college football at San Diego State.

Sampson died at the age of 44 on December 25, 2005, due to injuries sustained in a car accident.

References

1961 births
2005 deaths
American football wide receivers
San Diego State Aztecs football players
Denver Broncos players